The Central Stadium is a multi-purpose stadium in Kazan, Russia. It is currently used mostly for football matches and is the home ground of FC Rubin Kazan. The western half of the tribunes is covered with a canopy. In 2010, the stadium gained Four stars classification from UEFA.

Main characteristics
 Field size 110x73 m, marked out - 105x68 m
 Motomatic grass surface

External links
Stadium picture

References

FC Rubin Kazan
Football venues in Russia
Sports venues completed in 1960
Multi-purpose stadiums in Russia
Sport in Kazan
Buildings and structures in Kazan